Buud Yam is a 1997 Burkinabé historical drama film written and directed by Gaston Kaboré. It is the sequel to the film Wend Kuuni. As of 2001, it was the most popular African film ever in Burkina Faso.

The title's meaning is unclear: buud can mean both "ancestors" and "descendants", while yam means "spirit" or "intelligence." It has been translated as Soul of the Group.

Plot
The film draws on the African oral tradition. Set in a nineteenth century village, it follows a group of characters from Kaboré's debut film Wend Kuuni. Wend Kuuni (Serge Yanogo) is a young man who is suspected of being responsible, through the use of sorcery, for his adopted sister's ill health. To help his sister, and clear his name, he tries to find a healer who uses the legendary "lion's herbs". He also searches for his own roots.

Distribution and awards
In 1997, Buud Yam was shown at the Cannes Film Festival during Directors Fortnight and had its North American premiere at the Toronto International Film Festival. It won the Etalon de Yennega (the Grand Prize) at the 15th Ouagadougou Panafrican Film and Television Festival.

Cast
Colette Kaboré as Lalle
Amssatou Maïga as Pughneere
Sévérine Oueddouda as Komkeita
Boureima Ouedraogo as Razugu
Augustine Yameogo as Aunt
Serge Yanogo as Wend Kuuni

References

External links

 

1997 films
Films directed by Gaston Kaboré
Films set in the 19th century
More-language films
1990s historical drama films
Films set in pre-colonial sub-Saharan Africa
1997 drama films
Burkinabé drama films